Appointment with a Shadow is a 1957 American CinemaScope film noir crime film directed by Richard Carlson and starring George Nader, Joanna Moore, Brian Keith and Virginia Field.

It is not to be confused with the Tony Curtis film The Midnight Story, which was known in Britain as Appointment with a Shadow.

Plot
An alcoholic, Paul Baxter has ruined his career as a reporter. After passing out in Pat O'Connell's bar, he is taken home by his friend, police lieutenant Spencer, to his sister Penny, who is romantically involved with Spence.

Penny has a tip on a story that could change her brother's life, but will reveal it only on the condition that Paul can go 24 hours without drinking. Hungover and shaking, Paul tries.

He needs to be sober and alert at 7 p.m. when a fugitive criminal, Dutch Hayden, is supposed to show up at a restaurant. Spence has information that Hayden has undergone plastic surgery to alter his appearance and is about to leave the country.

Paul makes it on time, but in rocky shape. An accident causes his clothing to be soaked in liquor. Hayden arrives with his stripper girlfriend, Flo Knapp, but just as Spencer's men shoot him dead, Paul spots the real Hayden, whose face has not been changed at all. It's a set-up.

Every attempt made by Paul to persuade Spencer and Penny of the mistake goes for naught because they are certain that he was drunk. When he sets about proving Hayden is alive, Flo takes him captive at gunpoint. Only in the end does Spence realize that Paul was right all along.

Cast
 George Nader as Paul Baxter
 Joanna Moore as Penny
 Brian Keith as Lt. Spencer
 Virginia Field as Florence Knapp 
 Frank de Kova as Dutch Hayden
 Stephen Chase as Sam Crews

Production
The film was originally entitled If I Should Die and was based on a magazine story by Hugh Pentecost. The story was originally adapted by Herbert Dalmas and bought by Paramount in 1950.

Film rights eventually went to Universal. In 1956, head of production Don Hartman assigned the job of producing to his former assistant, Howie Horwitz. In 1956 Van Heflin signed to star and the film was going to be one of the studio's big productions of the year.

Filming was delayed. Alec Coppel did a script. In August 1957 it was announced Jeffrey Hunter would star; Hunter was under contract to 20th Century Fox but was allowed to do one outside film a year. The studio assigned Richard Carlson to direct. Carlson was better known for his acting, but also directed and had recently made Hemp Brown for Universal.

Filming began on 23 October 1957. Six days into filming Hunter fell ill with hepatitis and had to drop out; he had only filmed one day.  Filming re-commenced on 27 November 1957 with Universal contract player George Nader in Hunter's role.

Reception
The New York Times said the film "has as much novelty and enchantment as the popcorn machine in the lobby."

See also
 List of American films of 1957

References

External links

Appointment with a Shadow at BFI

Review at Variety

1957 films
Film noir
1957 crime drama films
American crime drama films
1950s English-language films
Films directed by Richard Carlson
Universal Pictures films
1950s American films